Why the Germans Do It Better: Notes from a Grown-Up Country is a 2020 book by British journalist John Kampfner. 

Publication rights in the Commonwealth of Nations, excluding Canada, were acquired by Atlantic Books in March 2019.

Summary

Reception

Critical reception 
Ben Hall for the Financial Times praised the work as "well-timed and well-aimed" in light of Germany's handling of the COVID-19 pandemic. David Edgerton in The Guardian suggested that the book was not just a study of Germany, but also a comparison between the United Kingdom after Brexit, and Germany. Similarly, Ruadhán Mac Cormaic for The Irish Times described the work as a "lament on the state of contemporary, growth-stunted Britain". Matthew Qvortrup described the book in Prospect as a "well-argued case" to learn from Germany. Oliver Moody of The Times described the book as an "impeccably fair guide" to Germany. Anne McElvoy for The Observer said the book was an "even-handed hymn to Germany" that "underlines why Britain will need its help in a post-Brexit world". Simon Heffer in The Daily Telegraph awarded the book two out of five stars.

Awards 
The book was long-listed for the 2021 Orwell Prize.

References

External links 
 Interview with John Kampfner on Why the Germans Do it Better from the Royal United Services Institute on YouTube

2020 non-fiction books
Books about Germany
Books about the United Kingdom
Atlantic Books books